István Ferenczi (born 14 September 1977) is a Hungarian former professional footballer who played as a forward. He gained nine caps for the Hungary national team between 2001 and 2008 and scored two goals. The last club he played for in the top flight of Hungarian football was Vasas SC. He was over 40 when he played his last first league game, and played two more professional games at the age of 43 for BFC Siófok in Nemzeti Bajnokság II, the second tier of Hungarian football. He is a  target man standing. He has scored goals in a number of countries including England, Turkey, Germany and his native Hungary.

Barnsley career

2006–2007
Ferenczi signed for Barnsley on 31 January 2007 – the transfer deadline day and incidentally the same week Barnsley captured fellow Hungarian Péter Rajczi. He made his Barnsley debut against Cardiff City on 2 February 2007 from the bench. Ferenczi scored his first goal in the game at Southampton when he headed home a Martin Devaney cross. In the following fixture against Hull City, Ferenczi scored a brace, the first he slid under the keeper after a defensive error and the second a bullet header from a Brian Howard cross. Ferenczi carried on his impressive scoring record as he scored a goal supplied by Péter Rajczi and beat Stoke City on 26 February 2007. This game was shown live on Sky Sports 1.

He added his fifth goal in four starts on 3 March, after terrifically heading in a Martin Devaney cross. Although Barnsley lost 3–1 Oakwell against Norwich City in that match. He failed to hit the target against Sunderland the following Saturday as Barnsley lost 2–0, but scored a last minute clincher against Plymouth Argyle on 14 March in a terrific 4–2 away win. He was a big hit with the fans in South Yorkshire and gained the nickname Stan.

2007–2008
Ferenczi started the first game of the season against Coventry City and was tugged and pulled all over the place by Elliott Ward but had no favours given to him by the referee. Three days later in the Carling Cup he got off the mark for the season after coming off the bench by heading home Rob Kozluk's cross.

He got off the mark in the League on 25 August in Barnsley's home game with Plymouth when he swept home Kayode Odejayi's low cross.

He suffered an ankle injury against Cardiff at Oakwell and missed five weeks, but he returned with a bang with new strike partner Jon Macken and scored two goals in as many games against Preston and Blackpool, both headers from Brian Howard free kicks. He also played in the memorable victories over Premier League sides Liverpool and Chelsea in the 2007–08 FA Cup.

In May 2008, Simon Davey transfer-listed Ferenczi (despite his desire to stay) along with four other players. Following initial interest from Nottingham Forest and an unnamed Swedish club, he signed a two-year contract for Ferencváros on 24 July 2008. Ferencváros are one of the highest rated clubs in Hungary and Stan wanted to play for them eventually.

2008–2009
Ferenczi had a remarkable return to his homeland, bagging 13 goals in the first seven games. As of 1 June 2009, he scored 39 goals in only 24 league matches.

Career statistics
Scores and results list Hungary's goal tally first, score column indicates score after each Ferenczi goal.

Honours
Levski Sofia
 Bulgarian A PFG: 2001–02

Debreceni VSC
 Nemzeti Bajnokság I: 2005–06
 Szuperkupa: 2006

Ferencváros
 Nemzeti Bajnokság II (Eastern Group): 2008–09

Individual
 Nemzeti Bajnokság II top scorer: 2008–09 with 39 goals

References

External links

Ferencváros profile 

1977 births
Living people
Sportspeople from Győr
Hungarian footballers
Hungary youth international footballers
Hungary under-21 international footballers
Hungary international footballers
Győri ETO FC players
Zalaegerszegi TE players
MTK Budapest FC players
PFC Levski Sofia players
VfL Osnabrück players
Vasas SC players
Çaykur Rizespor footballers
Debreceni VSC players
Barnsley F.C. players
Ferencvárosi TC footballers
Lombard-Pápa TFC footballers
Gyirmót FC Győr players
Nemzeti Bajnokság I players
2. Bundesliga players
First Professional Football League (Bulgaria) players
Hungarian expatriate footballers
Expatriate footballers in Bulgaria
Expatriate footballers in Germany
Expatriate footballers in Turkey
Expatriate footballers in England
Hungarian expatriate sportspeople in Bulgaria
Hungarian expatriate sportspeople in Germany
Hungarian expatriate sportspeople in Turkey
Hungarian expatriate sportspeople in England
Association football forwards
Nemzeti Bajnokság II players
Vasas SC managers
Hungarian football managers